Healthcare in Nigeria is a concurrent responsibility of the three tiers of government in the country. Private providers of healthcare have a visible role to play in health care delivery. The use of traditional medicine (TM) and complementary and alternative medicine (CAM) has increased significantly over the past few years.

Healthcare delivery in Nigeria has experienced progressive deterioration as a result of weakened political will on the part of successive governments to effectively solve a number of problems that have long existed in the sector over many years. This directly impacts the productivity of citizens and Nigeria's economic growth by Extensions to the International Phonetic
 Alphabet|extension]]. Over half of Nigeria's population live on less than $1.90 a day (‘Poverty Head-count’), making them one of the poorest populations in the world. As of February 2018, the country was ranked 187 out of 191 countries in the world in assessing the level of compliance with the Universal Health Coverage (UHC), as very little of the populace are health insured, whereas even government provision for health is insignificant. Out-of-pocket payments for health causes households to incur huge expenditure. Private expenditure on health as a percentage of total health expenditure is 74.85%.

The implication of this is that government expenditure for health is only 25.15 percent of all the money spent on health all across the nation. Of the percentage spent on health by the citizens (74.85%), about 70% is spent as out-of-pocket expenditure to pay for access to health services in both government and private facilities. Most of the remaining money spent by citizens on their health is spent on procuring ‘alternatives’ which cost a lot. Nigeria has better health personnel than most other African countries. However, considering  its size and population, there are fewer health workers per unit population than are required to provide effective health services to the entire nation. Sadly, the most commonly advertised reason is the brain drain of health professionals to other countries, especially in Europe and America.

Health infrastructure 
The federal government's role is mostly limited to coordinating the affairs of the university teaching hospitals, Federal Medical Centres (tertiary healthcare) while the state government manages the various general hospitals (secondary healthcare) and the local government focus on dispensaries (primary healthcare), which are regulated by the federal government through the NPHCDA.

The total expenditure on healthcare as % of GDP is 4.6, while the percentage of federal government expenditure on healthcare is about 1.5%. A long run indicator of the ability of the country to provide food sustenance and avoid malnutrition is the rate of growth of per capita food production; from 1970 to 1990, the rate for Nigeria was 0.25%.  Though small, the positive rate of per capita may be due to Nigeria's importing of food products.

Health insurance
Historically, health insurance in Nigeria could be applied to a few instances: free health care provided and financed for all citizens, health care provided by government through a special health insurance scheme for government employees and private firms entering contracts with private health care providers. However, there are few people who fall within the three instances; as at 2015 less than 5% of Nigerians have health insurance coverage.

In May 1999, the government created the National Health Insurance Scheme, encompassing government employees, the organized private sector and the informal sector. Legislatively the scheme also covers children under five, permanently disabled persons and prison inmates. In 2004, the administration of President Olusegun Obasanjo gave more legislative powers to the scheme with positive amendments to the original 1999 legislative act. 1.5 percent of Nigerians have been covered by the [[National Health Insurance Scheme (Nigeria)|National Health Insurance Scheme]] since its establishment. In 2017, the House of Representatives Committee on Health Care Services in Abuja, organized a two-day investigative hearing; where the Minister of Health Isaac Folorunsho Adewole said that the sum of N351 billion had been expended on health management organizations so far without commensurate result.

There is immense private sector participation in the scheme with HMOs like Health Partners HMO, Total Health Trust, Police HMO, Clearline HMO, Multi Shield Nigeria,  Expatcare Health International, Oceanic Health Management and Zuma Health Trust.

Bone marrow surgeries
A new bone marrow donor program, the second in Africa, opened in 2012. In cooperation with the University of Nigeria, it collects DNA swabs from people who might want to help a person with leukemia, lymphoma, or sickle cell disease to find a compatible donor for a life-saving bone marrow transplant.  It hopes to expand to include cord blood donations in the future.

Cancer care
About 80,000 Nigerians die of cancer annually and over 100,000 are diagnosed with cancer annually. More people are dying of cancer in Nigeria because cancer and non-communicable diseases are not given priority in the country's health budget. There are only seven cancer radiotherapy centres in Nigeria.

Many of the cancer-related deaths in Nigeria can be attributed to a lack of knowledge regarding this family of diseases. Furthermore, a lack of education on both prevention and early detection and a culture which endorses silence and places a negative social stigma on such illnesses has led to more than one-third of preventable cancer deaths.

Mental health
The majority of mental health services is provided by 8 regional psychiatric centers and psychiatric departments and medical schools of 12 major universities. A few general hospitals also provide mental health services. The formal centres often face competition from native herbalists and faith healing centres.

The ratio of psychologists and social workers is 0.02 to 100,000.

Issues

Regulation of pharmaceuticals
In 1989 legislation made effective a list of essential drugs. The regulation was also meant to limit the manufacture and import of fake or sub-standard drugs and to curtail false advertising. However, the section on essential drugs was later amended.  In 2005 it was estimated that about 16.7% of pharmaceutical drugs in the country were counterfeit. in 2012 a new study concluded that the proportion had fallen to 6.4%, of which 19.6% were Anti-Malaria medicines. In 2014 that had fallen to 3.6%. About N29 billion worth of counterfeit drugs were destroyed between 2015 – 2017.

Drug quality is primarily controlled by the National Agency for Food and Drug Administration and Control. The agency has established a Mobile Authentication Service.  A team of girls from the Regina Pacis Secondary School in Onitsha devised a better technological solution, an app called the FD Detector which uses barcode technology to verify drug authenticity and expiration dates. This won them a place in the Technovation Challenge 2018.

Several major regulatory failures have produced international scandals:

In 1993, adulterated paracetamol syrup entered into the healthcare system in Oyo and Benue State, the result of was the death of 100 children. A year after the disaster, batches containing poisonous ethylene glycol, the major cause of the deaths, could still be purchased.
In 1996, about 11 children died of contamination from an experimental trial of the drug trovafloxacin.
In 2008–2009, at least 84 children died from a brand of contaminated teething medication.

Geographic inequality

Healthcare in Nigeria is influenced by different local and regional factors that impact the quality or quantity present in one location. Due to the aforementioned, the healthcare system in Nigeria has shown spatial variation in terms of availability and quality of facilities in relation to need. However, this is largely as a result of the level of state and local government involvement and investment in health care programs and education. Also, the Nigerian ministry of health usually spend about 70% of its budget in urban areas where around 50% of the population resides.

Emigration of healthcare workers

Survey shows looming brain drain in Nigeria's health sector in the rising trend of emigration of healthcare personnel – physicians, pharmacists, nurses, and laboratory scientists, physiotherapists and many others have difficulty getting into paid employment. Many fresh doctors,  out of medical schools, and managed to get housemanship positions, the situation occurs every year. The problem persists beyond the period of housemanship or internship, when it comes to securing a well deserved employment. There are generally not enough job positions to go round. The challenge of this is clear. The problem of [[Sk distribution, with the few available personnel being mostly lol in the urban areas, where almost all the large facilities like General Hospitals and Teaching Hospitals are located. The underneath issues for this may include the political dimension, with some states unwilling to recruit large numbers of workers from other parts of the country as an act of deliberate policy, preferring to employ their own indigenes, or, where there is a short-fall,  employ foreigners mostly from North Africa on short-term contracts. In 2007, a National Human Resources for Health Policy was formulated by the Federal Ministry of Health and approved by the National Council on Health. Subsequently, a Human Resource for Health Strategic Plan 2008–2012 was drawn up to guide implementation of the policy at all levels. The ultimate aim was to ensure that adequate numbers of skilled and well-motivated health workers were available and equitably distributed through the nation in order to ensure provision of quality health services. The situation appears set to get worse. As the era of Sustainable Development Goals is commenced and the target of 2030 begins to come into focus, the statistics are far from providing reassurance.

There are 4000 Nigeria doctors practicing in the United States and 8000 practicing in the United Kingdom. Retaining these expensively trained professionals has been identified as an urgent goal. The brain drain cut across all healthcare professionals; thousands of Nigerian pharmacists and nurses are practicing in the UK and USA as well and so on.

===Privatization and commercialization of public health service ===
The public health services in Nigeria is of poor quality and it is not adequately available, accessible, and affordable to many people who need these services. The search for solutions has led to the idea of privatization and commercialisation of public health services. This development is greatly favoured by the idea that it will increase competition and result in the lowering of unit price of health services and make such services more affordable to the poor. However, the argument against it is that privatization and commercialization in Nigeria will be a mirage unless institutional reforms take place.

Traditional and alternative medicine

As recent reports have shown, in addition to the many benefits there are also risks associated with the different types of traditional medicine /complementary or alternative medicine. Although consumers today have widespread access to various TM/CAM treatments and therapies, they often do not have enough information on what to check when using TM/CAM in order to avoid unnecessary harm. While traditional medicine has a lot to contribute to the health and economy, much harm has resulted from unregulated sale and misuse of traditional/alternative medicine and herbs in the country and has delayed patients' seeking professional healthcare.

See also
 Health in Nigeria
 Mental health policies in Nigeria
 Nigerian Medical Association
 EMDEX (Essential Medicines InDEX) - A Reference Source of Drug & Therapeutic Information for Nigeria's Healthcare Professionals

References

Sources